The Kittenberger Kálmán Zoo and Botanical Garden is located in Veszprém, Hungary. The zoo offers entertainment for both young and elderly visitors. The Kittenberger Kálmán Zoo and Botanical Garden, opened on 1 August 1958, was built in five months through the support of community volunteers.

Zoo background 
The Kittenberger Kálmán Zoo and Botanical Garden consists of two parts, one in the Fejes Valley and one in the adjacent Gulya Hill. The Fejes Valley Zoo offers visitors a view of traditional zoo animals, including exotic cats, Kamchatka brown bears, water birds, Madagascan lemurs, the Gelada baboons, tapirs, meerkats, and red pandas.

The zoo offers the individually designed and built Kids Jungle and Vivarium, where children seeking adventure can crawl to experience the Sloth Way and climb into boxes usually used for animal transport. Children can also rest in the Parrot Club or slide down to the ground. The play area is surrounded by terrariums where various exotic amphibians can be seen behind the glass panels. , new developments are located in the upper part on Gulya Hill, such as the Africa House, the Chimpanzee World, and African Savannah enclosures, where visitors can observe zebras, giraffes, and the three members of the rhino family.

The Chimpanzee World was built next to the Savannah enclosure, housing two groups of chimpanzees. In the inner area, a glass panel separates the chimps and the visitors, while in the outer enclosure, a moat serves the same function. The chimp Böbe educational and exhibition hall houses summer camps and school sessions, while the exhibition area shows a display relating to issues of environmental protection. Visitors can participate in public feeding sessions, as well as view animals in the petting zoo.

References 

Zoos in Hungary
Botanical gardens in Hungary
Tourist attractions in Veszprém County
Buildings and structures in Veszprém County
Zoos established in 1958
1958 establishments in Hungary
Articles needing infobox zoo